Logic and Sexual Morality is a 1965 book by John Boyd Wilson in which the author provides a critique of philosophical arguments about sex.

Reception
The book was reviewed by John C. Hall and David Sladen.

References

External links 
 Logic and Sexual Morality

1965 non-fiction books
Sexual ethics books
Penguin Books books
Logic books
English-language books